Panzerblitz is a German anti-tank unguided aerial rocket developed during the Second World War.

The missile was based on the R4M Orkan air-to-air rocket used by the Messerschmitt Me 262. It was fitted with either an -diameter standard warhead, in Panzerblitz I, or a -diameter  hollow charge warhead, in the Panzerblitz III.

It was intended to be operated by the Henschel Hs 132, which would carry up to eight rockets, complementing or even replacing the cannon armament in the tank-destroying role. The 80mm model was tested extensively in early 1945 from Focke-Wulf Fw 190s, but neither Panzerblitz I nor Panzerblitz III (earmarked exclusively for the Hs 132) were ready for use by the German surrender in May 1945.

A Panzerblitz rocket pod was in development. It would have been for the Ar-234 C and each pod would have contained 20 Panzerblitz rockets.

Specifications

References

Sources
 Green, William. Warplanes of the Third Reich. London: Macdonald and Jane's Publishers Ltd., 1970 (fourth impression 1979). .
 Smith, J.Richard and Kay, Anthony. German Aircraft of the Second World War. London: Putnam & Company Ltd., 1972 (third impression 1978). .
 Wood, Tony and Gunston, Bill. Hitler's Luftwaffe: A pictorial history and technical encyclopedia of Hitler's air power in World War II. London: Salamander Books Ltd., 1977. .

Anti-tank rockets
Air-to-ground rockets
World War II weapons of Germany
Research and development in Nazi Germany
Weapons and ammunition introduced in 1945